"Ghost Brigade" is a song by English rock band Creeper. Written by the band's lead vocalist Will Gould, guitarist Ian Miles, frequent collaborator Neil Kennedy, and producer Tom Dalgety, it was released on 4 November 2022 as the first single from the group's as-yet unannounced third studio album. The song was announced and published on streaming services at the end of the band's show When the Sun Comes at the Roundhouse in London, which marked the conclusion of the band's Sex, Death & the Infinite Void promotional cycle. "Ghost Brigade" is Creeper's first release on Spinefarm Records, with whom they signed in 2022, as well as the first to feature drummer Jake Fogarty, who joined in 2021.

Background
Creeper played the last show of the promotional cycle for Sex, Death & the Infinite Void and American Noir at the Roundhouse in London on 4 November 2022. At the end of the show, a theatrical "decapitation" of the band's frontman Will Gould was staged, after which their signing with Spinefarm Records and the release of "Ghost Brigade" were announced. The single was the band's first to be produced by Tom Dalgety, who had previously worked with groups including Ghost, Royal Blood and the Damned.

Reception
NME reporter Ellie Robinson hailed "Ghost Brigade" as "energised" and "biting", comparing it to "The Black Parade-era My Chemical Romance" and praising the track's "boisterous and crunchy guitars, soaring vocal melodies and a theatrical, xylophone-accented bridge". Writing for Rock Sound online, Jack Rogers claimed that the song "feels like it harks back to the very beginning of the band" as "a fantastical and furious piece of punk-rock fury". Describing the track as "fan-fucking-tastic", he also highlighted its "Circle-pit inciting pace, gorgeous drama that turns your blood to ice and the sort of old-school melodies that are made to be screamed at the top of your lungs". Ashley Perez Hollingsworth of Genre Is Dead also likened "Ghost Brigade" to Creeper's older material, claiming that it "feels like the band returning to their punk rock roots". Clash writer Robin Murray dubbed the song "a cathartic slice of gothic punk that taps into the lingering threat of Halloween".

Personnel
Will Gould – lead vocals
Ian Miles – guitar
Sean Scott – bass
Hannah Greenwood – piano, backing vocals
Jake Fogarty – drums
Tom Dalgety – production, engineering, mixing
Joe Jones – engineering

References

External links
"Ghost Brigade" audio on YouTube

2022 songs
2022 singles
Creeper (band) songs
Spinefarm Records singles
Song recordings produced by Tom Dalgety